A list of films produced in the Soviet Union in 1957 (see 1957 in film).

1957

See also
1957 in the Soviet Union

External links
 Soviet films of 1957 at the Internet Movie Database

1957
Soviet
Films